The Hittitic spring minnow (Pseudophoxinus hittitorum) is a species of Cyprinid fish.
It is found in drainages in central Anatolia in Turkey.

References

Pseudophoxinus
Endemic fauna of Turkey
Fish described in 2010